The Deputy Premier of New South Wales is the second-most senior officer in the Government of New South Wales. The deputy premiership has been a ministerial portfolio since 1932, and the deputy premier is appointed by the Governor on the advice of the Premier.

The current Deputy Premier is Paul Toole, since 6 October 2021. Toole is also the Minister for Police, and the Minister for Regional New South Wales.

Ultimately, the Deputy Premier is responsible to the Parliament of New South Wales.

History
The office of Deputy Premier was created in May 1932 for Michael Bruxner, the leader of the Country Party (later renamed the National Party). Prior to that time the term was sometimes used unofficially (without capital letters) for the second-highest ranking minister in the government.

In Labor governments, the deputy premier is the party's deputy leader. Generally speaking, this person has come from the left faction of the party whereas the premier has come from the right faction. In Liberal-National Coalition governments, the position has been held by the Leader of the National Party or its predecessors.

Three deputy premiers have subsequently become Premier in their own right: Joseph Cahill, Robert Heffron, and Jack Renshaw. However, this has not occurred since 1964.

Duties
The duties of the deputy premier are to act on behalf of the premier in his or her absence overseas or on leave. The deputy premier has always been a member of the Cabinet, and has always held at least one substantive portfolio (It would be technically possible for a minister to hold only the portfolio of Deputy Premier, but this has never happened).

If the premier were to die, become incapacitated or resign, the Governor would normally appoint the deputy premier as Premier.  If the governing or majority party had not yet elected a new leader, that appointment would be on an interim basis.  Should a different leader emerge, that person would then be appointed Premier.

List of deputy premiers of New South Wales
 Political parties

See also 

List of New South Wales government agencies
 Leader of the New South Wales National Party

References 

 
New South Wales
Deputy Premier